The Furness Railway 1 class 0-6-0 (classified "D5" by Bob Rush) was a class of nineteen 0-6-0 steam locomotives designed by W. F. Pettigrew and built between 1913 and 1920. Four were built by Kitson and Company and 15 by North British Locomotive Company (NBL).
All 19 were assigned London, Midland and Scottish Railway numbers but only six survived long enough to be assigned a British Railways number.

History
The Class D5 0-6-0 was the final development of the Furness Railway six-coupled goods engine. The class utilised the standardised  wheels and  cylinders of which W. F. Pettigrew had become a great proponent.

Construction
Initially only four were built but, during World War I, a further fifteen were added, all of which had boilers six inches longer than the first four, making them generally more capable but two tonnes heavier.

Performance
The D5 was the largest and most powerful of the mineral engines on the Furness Railway and like many of the 0-6-0 class locomotives on the Furness Railway it was fitted with vacuum brakes and steam heating this permitted it to be used on excursions and railtours.

Numbering

Withdrawal

Withdrawals began on 1930 when four, Nos. 12502–03/05–06 were withdrawn. Six survived into BR service, being the only ex-Furness Railway locomotives to survive into BR ownership. The last were withdrawn in 1957 and none of the class were preserved.

References

Standard gauge steam locomotives of Great Britain
D5
0-6-0 locomotives
Railway locomotives introduced in 1913
NBL locomotives
Kitson locomotives
Scrapped locomotives